Hylodes fredi is a species of frog in the family Hylodidae, endemic to the island of Ilha Grande, Brazil.

Description and biology
The tadpoles of Hylodes fredi whose limb buds have not yet formed reach a maximum size of 75.3 millimeters. Their color ranges between gray and brown; additionally, brown splotches can be seen on the body. The abdomen is slightly transparent, and the caudal fins are opaque. Adult males have been observed in calling activity throughout almost the whole year.

References

Hylodes
Endemic fauna of Brazil
Amphibians of Brazil
Amphibians described in 2007